Clachnaharry railway station served the village of Clachnaharry, Highland, Scotland from 1868 to 1913 on the Inverness and Ross-shire Railway.

History 
The station opened on 1 April 1868 by the Inverness and Aberdeen Junction Railway.  The station closed to both passengers and goods traffic on 1 April 1913.

References

External links 

Disused railway stations in Highland (council area)
Former Highland Railway stations
Railway stations in Great Britain opened in 1869
Railway stations in Great Britain closed in 1913
1869 establishments in Scotland
1913 disestablishments in Scotland